René of Anjou (16 January 1409 – 10 July 1480) was Duke of Anjou and Count of Provence from 1434 to 1480, who also reigned as King of Naples as René I from 1435 to 1442 (then deposed as the preceding dynasty was restored to power). Having spent his last years in Aix-en-Provence, he is known in France as the Good King René.

René was a member of the House of Valois-Anjou, a cadet branch of the French royal house, and the great-grandson of John II of France.  He was a prince of the blood, and for most of his adult life also the brother-in-law of the reigning king Charles VII of France. Other than the aforementioned titles, he was for several years also Duke of Bar and Duke of Lorraine.

Biography

René was born on 16 January 1409 in the castle of Angers. He was the second son of Duke Louis II of Anjou, King of Naples, by Yolanda of Aragon. René was the brother of Marie of Anjou, who married the future Charles VII and became Queen of France.

Louis II died in 1417 and his sons, together with their brother-in-law Charles, were brought up under the guardianship of their mother. The elder son, Louis III, succeeded to the crown of Sicily and the Duchy of Anjou; René then became Count of Guise. In 1419, when René was only ten, he was legally married to Isabella, elder daughter of Charles II, Duke of Lorraine.

René, then only ten, was to be brought up in Lorraine under the guardianship of Charles II and Louis, cardinal of Bar, both of whom were attached to the Burgundian party, but he retained the right to bear the arms of Anjou. He was far from sympathizing with the Burgundians. Joining the French army at Reims in 1429, he was present at the consecration of Charles VII. When Louis of Bar died in 1430, René inherited the duchy of Bar. The next year, on his father-in-law's death, he succeeded to the duchy of Lorraine. The inheritance was contested by the heir-male, Antoine de Vaudemont, who with Burgundian help defeated René at Bulgneville in July 1431. The Duchess Isabella effected a truce with Antoine, but the duke remained a prisoner of the Burgundians until April 1432, when he recovered his liberty on parole on yielding up as hostages his two sons, John and Louis.

René's title as duke of Lorraine was confirmed by his suzerain, Holy Roman Emperor Sigismund, at Basel in 1434. This proceeding roused the anger of the Burgundian duke, Philip the Good, who required him early in the next year to return to his prison, from which he was released two years later on payment of a heavy ransom. At the death of his brother Louis III in 1435, he succeeded to the Duchy of Anjou and County of Maine. The marriage of Marie of Bourbon, niece of Philip of Burgundy, with John, Duke of Calabria, René's eldest son, cemented peace between the two families.

Joanna II, queen of Naples, had chosen Louis III as her presumptive heir and upon Louis' death offered it to René to inherit her kingdom after her death. After appointing a regency in Bar and Lorraine, he set sail for Naples in 1438.

Naples, however, was also claimed by Alfonso V of Aragon, who had been first adopted and then repudiated by Joanna II. In 1441 Alfonso laid a six-month siege to Naples. René returned to France in the same year, and though he retained the title of king of Naples his effective rule was never recovered. Later efforts to recover his rights in Italy failed. His mother Yolande, who had governed Anjou in his absence, died in 1442.

René took part in the negotiations with the English at Tours in 1444, and peace was consolidated by the marriage of his younger daughter, Margaret, with Henry VI of England at Nancy.

René now made over the government of Lorraine to his son John, who was, however, only formally installed as Duke of Lorraine on the death of Queen Isabella in 1453. René had the confidence of Charles VII, and is said to have initiated the reduction of the men-at-arms set on foot by the king, with whose military operations against the English he was closely associated. He entered Rouen with him in November 1449.

After his second marriage with Jeanne de Laval, daughter of Guy of Laval and Isabella of Brittany, René took a less active part in public affairs, devoting himself to composing poetry and painting miniatures, gardening and raising animals. The fortunes of his house declined in his old age: in 1466, the rebellious Catalans offered the crown of Aragon to René. His son John, unsuccessful in Italy, was sent to take up the conquest of that kingdom but died —apparently by poison— at Barcelona on 16 December 1470. John's eldest son Nicholas perished in 1473, also under suspicion of poisoning. In 1471, René's daughter Margaret was finally defeated in the Wars of the Roses. Her husband and her son were killed and she herself became a prisoner who had to be ransomed by Louis XI in 1476.

René retired to Aix-en-Provence and in 1474 made a will by which he left Bar to his grandson René II, Duke of Lorraine; and Anjou and Provence to his nephew Charles, count of Le Maine. King Louis XI seized Anjou and Bar, and two years later sought to compel René to exchange the two duchies for a pension. The offer was rejected, but further negotiations assured the lapse to the crown of the duchy of Anjou and the annexation of Provence was only postponed until the death of the Count of Le Maine. René died on 10 July 1480 at Aix, but was buried in the cathedral of Angers. In the 19th century, historians bestowed on him the epithet "the good".

He founded an order of chivalry, the Ordre du Croissant, which preceded the royal foundation of St Michael but did not survive René.

Arts

The King of Sicily's fame as an amateur painter formerly led to the optimistic attribution to him of many paintings in Anjou and Provence, in many cases simply because they bore his arms. These works are generally in the Early Netherlandish style, and were probably executed under his patronage and direction, so that he may be said to have formed a school of the fine arts in sculpture, painting, goldsmith's work and tapestry. He employed Barthélemy d'Eyck as both painter and varlet de chambre for most of his career.

Two of the most famous works formerly attributed to René are the triptych of the Burning Bush of Nicolas Froment of Avignon in Aix Cathedral, showing portraits of René and his second wife, Jeanne de Laval, and two illuminated Book of Hours in the Bibliothèque nationale de France and the British Library. Among the men of letters attached to his court was Antoine de la Sale, whom he made tutor to his son John. He encouraged the performance of mystery plays; on the performance of a mystery of the Passion at Saumur in 1462 he remitted four years of taxes to the town, and the representations of the Passion at Angers were carried out under his auspices.

He exchanged verses with his kinsman, the poet Charles of Orléans. René was also the author of two allegorical works: a devotional dialogue, Le Mortifiement de vaine plaisance (The Mortification of Vain Pleasure, 1455), and a love quest, Le Livre du Cuer d'amours espris (The Book of the Love-Smitten Heart, 1457).  The latter fuses the conventions of Arthurian romance with an allegory of love based on the Romance of the Rose.  Both works were exquisitely illustrated by his court painter, Barthélémy d'Eyck.  Le Mortifiement survives in eight illuminated manuscripts. Although Barthélémy's original is lost, the extant manuscripts include copies of his miniatures by Jean le Tavernier, Jean Colombe, and others. René is sometimes credited with the pastoral poem "Regnault and Jeanneton", but this was more likely a gift to the king honoring his marriage to Jeanne de Laval.

King René's Tournament Book ( or) describes rules of a tournament. The most famous and earliest of the many manuscript copies is kept in the French National Library. This is—unusually for a deluxe manuscript—on paper and painted in watercolor.  It may represent drawings by Barthélemy d'Eyck, intended as preparatory only, which were later illuminated by him or another artist.  There are twenty-six full and double page miniatures. The description given in the book is different from that of the pas d'armes held at Razilly and Saumur; conspicuously absent are the allegorical and chivalresque ornamentations that were in vogue at the time. René instead emphasizes he is reporting on ancient tournament customs of France, Germany and the Low Countries, combining them in a new suggestion on how to hold a tournament. The tournament described is a melee fought by two sides. Individual jousts are only briefly mentioned.

As a patron, René commissioned translations and retranslations of classical works into French prose. These include Strabo, which Guarino da Verona completed in 1458; and Ovid's Metamorphoses by an unknown translator, completed in 1467.

Marriages and issue

René married:
 Isabelle, Duchess of Lorraine (1400 – 28 February 1453) on 24 October 1420
 Jeanne de Laval, on 10 September 1454, at the Abbey of St. Nicholas in Angers

His legitimate children by Isabelle were:

 John II (2 August 1424 – 16 December 1470), Duke of Lorraine and King of Naples, married Marie de Bourbon, daughter of Charles I, Duke of Bourbon, by whom he had issue. He also had several illegitimate children.
 Louis (16 October 1427 – between 22 May and 16 October 1444), Marquis of Pont-à-Mousson and Lieutenant General of Lorraine. At the age of five, in 1432, he was sent as a hostage to Dijon with his brother John in exchange for their captive father. John was released, but Louis was not and died of pneumonia in prison.
 Nicholas (2 November 1428 – 1430), twin with Yolande.
 Yolande (2 November 1428 – 23 March 1483), married Frederick of Lorraine, count of Vaudemont; mother, among others, of Duke René II of Lorraine.
 Margaret (23 March 1430 – 25 August 1482), married King Henry VI of England, by whom she had a son, Edward of Westminster, Prince of Wales.
 Charles (1431 – 1432), Count of Guise.
 Isabelle (died young).
 René (died young).
 Louise (1436 – 1438).
 Anne (1437 – 1450, buried in Gardanne).

He also had three illegitimate children:

 John, Bastard of Anjou (d. 1536), Marquis of Pont-à-Mousson, married 1500 Marguerite de Glandeves-Faucon.
 Jeanne Blanche (d. 1470), Lady of Mirebeau, married in Paris 1467 Bertrand de Beauvau (d. 1474).
 Madeleine (d. aft. 1515), Countess of Montferrand, married in Tours 1496 Louis Jean, seigneur de Bellenave.

Cultural references

He appears as "Reignier" in William Shakespeare's play Henry VI, part 1. His alleged poverty for a king is satirised. He pretends to be the Dauphin to deceive Joan of Arc, but she sees through him. She later claims to be pregnant with his child.

René's honeymoon, devoted with his bride to the arts, is imagined in Walter Scott's novel Anne of Geierstein (1829). The imaginary scene of his honeymoon was later depicted by the Pre-Raphaelite painters Ford Madox Brown, Edward Burne-Jones and Dante Gabriel Rossetti.

In 1845 the Danish poet Henrik Hertz wrote the play King René's Daughter about René and his daughter Yolande de Bar; this was later adapted into the opera Iolanta by Tchaikovsky.

René and his Order of the Crescent were adopted as "historical founders" by the Lambda Chi Alpha fraternity in 1912, as exemplars of Christian chivalry and charity. Ceremonies of the Order of the Crescent were referenced in formulating ceremonies for the fraternity.

In conspiracy theories, such as the one promoted in The Holy Blood and the Holy Grail, René has been alleged to be the ninth Grand Master of the Priory of Sion.

La Cheminée du roi René (The Fireplace of King René), op. 205, is a suite for wind quintet, composed in 1941 by Darius Milhaud.

Chant du Roi René (Song of King René) is a piece for organ (or harmonium) by Alexandre Guilmant (1837–1911) from his collection of Noels (Op.60).  The theme used throughout this piece was alleged to have been written by René (Guilmant's source was Alphonse Pellet, organist at Nîmes Cathedral).

Arms 
René frequently changed his coat of arms, which represented his numerous and fluctuating claims to titles, both actual and nominal.
The Coat of arms of René in 1420; Composing the arms of the House of Valois-Anjou (top left and bottom right), Duchy of Bar (top right and bottom left), and of the Duchy of Lorraine (superimposed shield). In 1434 were added Hungary, Kingdom of Naples and Jerusalem. The arms of the Crown of Aragon were shown from 1443 to 1470. In 1453 the arms of Lorraine were removed and in 1470 Valois-Anjou were substituted for the modern arms of the duchy (superimposed shield).

See also
 Pas de la Bergère

Notes

References

Sources
 
 
 
 
 
 
 
 
 
 
 

Attribution:

Further reading
 Unterkircher F., King René's Book of Love (Le Cueur d'Amours Espris), 1980, George Braziller, New York,

External links

 Website about Rene I of Naples
 King René's Tournament Book
 BnF 27 images  Add "Français 2695" to left "Cote" box, click "Chercher" and "Images"
 online translation of text

1409 births
1480 deaths
15th-century Aragonese monarchs
15th-century monarchs of Naples
Counts of Barcelona
Counts of Guise
Counts of Piedmont
Counts of Provence
Dukes of Anjou
Dukes of Bar
Dukes of Calabria
Dukes of Lorraine
House of Valois-Anjou
Claimant Kings of Jerusalem
Marquesses of Pont-à-Mousson
Monarchs of Naples
People from Angers
15th-century peers of France
Sons of kings